Frank Baxter may refer to:
Frank William Baxter (1869–1896), Rhodesian soldier
Frank C. Baxter (1896–1982), American educator and television personality
 Frank E. Baxter (born 1938), Republican American businessman and diplomat